Kalamazoo is a city in Michigan, United States.

Kalamazoo may also refer to:

Other places 
 Kalamazoo, Florida, U.S.
 Kalamazoo, Nebraska, U.S.
 Kalamazoo, West Virginia, U.S.
 Kalamazoo County, Michigan, U.S.
 Kalamazoo–Portage metropolitan area, Michigan, U.S.
 Kalamazoo River, in Michigan, U.S.

Arts and entertainment

Film 
 Kalamazoo (film), a 1988 Canadian fantasy drama film
 Kalamazoo?, a 2006 American comedy film

Music 
 "(I've Got a Gal In) Kalamazoo", a 1942 song by Glenn Miller and His Orchestra
 "Kalamazoo", a song by Primus from the 1997 Brown Album
 "Kalamazoo", a song by Ben Folds from the 2004 EP Super D
 "Kalamazoo" by Luna from the 1995 album Penthouse

Businesses and brands 
 Gibson Kalamazoo, two different lines of instruments produced by Gibson
 Kalamazoo Manufacturing Company, manufacturer of railroad equipment from 1883 to the 1990s
 Kalamazoo, a railroad handcar powered by its passengers
 Kalamazoo Loose Leaf Binder Company, taken over by Remington Rand in 1927 
 Kalamazoo, supplier of business stationery 1913–1980s, and later Kalamazoo IT, in Northfield, Birmingham, England

Other uses 
 Kalamazoo College, in Kalamazoo, Michigan, U.S.
 , the name of several ships

See also 

 Etymology of Kalamazoo
 Kazoo, a simple musical instrument